Diasporus diastema is a species of frog in the family Eleutherodactylidae. Common names include common tink frog or dink frog, supposedly because of the loud metallic "tink" sound that the male frog makes during the night. It is found in Central America, from Honduras through Nicaragua and Costa Rica to Panama. Its natural habitats are tropical humid lowland forests and montane forests, but it can very disturbed habitats. It is found from sea level to  elevation.

Its color during daylight hours, when it hides, is grayish brown with spots or bars; when it emerges at night and becomes active, the frog takes on a pale pink or tan color.

The adult female reaches up to 1 inch (24 mm) long, and the male about 3/4 inch (21 mm). The tink frog has no free-swimming tadpole stage, and instead emerges as a miniature frog directly from the egg. Eggs are laid in bromeliads and tended by the male.

The diet of the tink frog consists mainly of ants and other arthropods.

References

 Kinsey, T. B. Dink Frogs. The Firefly Forest. Retrieved May 2013.
 Strieter, A. Common Tink Frog. Anywhere Costa Rica. Retrieved May 2013.

External links

diastema
Amphibians of Costa Rica
Amphibians of Honduras
Amphibians of Nicaragua
Amphibians of Panama
Amphibians described in 1875
Taxa named by Edward Drinker Cope
Taxonomy articles created by Polbot